Ganesh Venkatraman is an Indian actor who works predominantly in Tamil and Telugu films. He had acted in Radha Mohan's Abhiyum Naanum (2008), before working in Unnaipol Oruvan (2009) and Kandahar (2010).

Career
Ganesh began his acting career by appearing in television serials. It including Antariksh and Mayavi, which was the first known 3D serial in Tamil television. He made his film début with The Angrez (2006), an experimental crossover film shot in Hyderabadi Urdu but he could not garner any further film offers immediately. Subsequently, he made his début in Tamil cinema with Radha Mohan's family drama, Abhiyum Naanum (2008). He was cast in the role of Trisha's Punjabi fiancé, this role received critical acclaim. He worked with Prakash Raj in his second film. He appeared as a police officer, working alongside Kamal Haasan, Mohanlal and Venkatesh in the bilingual film Unnaipol Oruvan (2009), while he also portrayed an army general in Major Ravi's war film Kandahar. He also worked in a thriller film titled Muriyadi with Sathyaraj by Selva, but the film failed to have a theatrical release owing to Kavithalayaa Productions' financial troubles. During the period, Ganesh also opted out of another multi-starrer Mankatha (2011), and instead chose to work on another bilingual Tamil and Hindi film, Panithuli (2012), in a solo lead role. The film opened to negative reviews and performed poorly at the box office. 

Ganesh worked on three projects in 2013, prioritising his work on Tamil cinema. He appeared in Sundar C's bilingual film, Theeya Velai Seiyyanum Kumaru in a supporting role of an office worker, while he was seen as a police officer in the action film, Ivan Veramathiri. He also portrayed the role of a prince in Roopa Iyer's Kannada and Tamil bilingual film, Chandra, and revealed that he signed on after hearing that Shriya Saran would be portraying the lead role. Ganesh subsequently worked on a few low budget films, the psychological thriller Achaaram (2015) and the drama Pallikoodam Pogamale (2015), both of which had limited theatrical releases. During the same year, he also portrayed a supporting role in Mohan Raja's Thani Oruvan (2015), which went on to become a success. His following his releases have fared less well with Thodari (2016) and Nayaki (2016), where he portrayed the antagonist, earning negative reviews and performing poorly at the box office. Likewise, neither of his subsequent investigative thriller films Inayathalam (2017) or 7 Naatkal (2017) were able to perform well commercially. For his role in Inayathalam, Ganesh spent time with the Chennai cyber-crime division to prepare for his character.

Ganesh will next appear as a supporting cast in Vanangamudi as a police officer alongside Aravind Swamy. His long-delayed Hindi film, Guns of Banaras is also expected to have a theatrical release in late 2017.

Other work
Prior to acting, Ganesh Venkatraman was a model and had been chosen Gladrags Mr. India 2003 and been a representative for India in Mr. World 2004. In September 2014, Ganesh made his debut as a television host by presenting the reality game show Vendhar Veetu Kalyanam on Vendhar TV. He later appeared in the reality show Achcham Thavir by Star Vijay. In 2017, he took part as a contestant in the Bigg Boss reality show, and finished as the show's third runner up.

Personal life
Ganesh Venkatraman was born to parents, who are Tamil Brahmin Iyer. He and actress Nisha Krishnan got married in November 2015. In June 2019 they had their first child, Samaira.

Filmography

Television

References

External links

Living people
Indian male film actors
Tamil male actors
Male actors in Tamil cinema
21st-century Indian male actors
Male actors in Kannada cinema
Indian male television actors
Indian television presenters
Male actors in Hindi cinema
Male actors in Malayalam cinema
Male actors from Mumbai
Year of birth missing (living people)
Bigg Boss (Tamil TV series) contestants